Little Belize is a colony of conservative Plautdietsch-speaking "Russian" Mennonites, known as "Old Colony Mennonites", in the Corozal District of Belize. Little Belize is located east of Progresso at an elevation of 1 meter above sea level. Because the Mennonite colony is close to Progresso, it is sometimes called "Progresso".

According to the 2000 census, the population of Little Belize was 2,059 people. In 2010 the population had grown to 2,650 people in 427 households. In 2017 population has reached 2,830 people. Little Belize is the second most populous Mennonite settlement in the country, after Shipyard.

See also 
Mennonites in Belize

References

External links
A Simple Life | Mennonites living in Belize exist apart from the government, with limited technology and surrounded by farmable land.  The New York Times, Eve Lyons, 15.09.2018

Mennonitism in Belize
Old Colony Mennonites
Populated places in Corozal District
Russian Mennonite diaspora in Belize